Faceshift is a metal band, formed in 2005 in Stockholm, Sweden.

History
Faceshift, from Stockholm, Sweden is a band that while firmly rooted in classic heavy metal from the 80´s and 90´s, incorporates elements of grunge, prog, death and blues to create their own unique blend of music. The band's second album, the critically acclaimed All Crumbles Down embodies the diversity of all the members and their musical origins, ranging from drummer Stefan Norgren´s prog metal roots from Seventh Wonder, via singer Timo Hovinen´s grunge-esque vocals, through the death landscapes mastered by bassist Mika Kajanen and Petri Tarvainen to lead guitarist David Bertilsson´s bluesy touch. Immune to trends and fads, Faceshift writes, records, produces and performs from the heart and anyone who has seen, heard or experienced Faceshift will tell you that they´re a true force to be reckoned with.

Discography

Albums
2015 All Crumbles Down (Mighty Music)
Track list:
Betrayed
The Lie
Pieces
A New Beginning
Someone to Be
Of Dignity and Shame
Awaken
Painted Life
Stand Alone
On the Inside
When All Crumbles Down
2007: Reconcile (Black Lodge Records)
Track list:
Reality/Fatality (3:54)
My Own Demise (4:20)
Self Appointed Victim (3:41)
No Cure Sickness (3:35)
Live the Lie (5:17)
The Dark Domain (4:26)
Chokehold (4:11)
Reconcile (4:03)
Greater Than I (3:42)
The Craving (4:09)
Bound (3:18)
Conclusion (4:51)

Singles
2012: "A New Beginning"
Track list:
New Beginning (04.17)
Awaken (04.39)

2007: "Chokehold" (Black Lodge Records)

Members
From Faceshift's official Facebook page.
Timo Hovinen – Lead Vocals
Stefan Norgren – Drums, Backing Vocals
David Bertilsson – Lead Guitar
Petri Tarvainen – Rhythm Guitar
Helene Norgren – Bass Guitar

Past members
Peter Nagy-Eklöf – Guitar (2005–2008)
Peter Wendin – Bass Guitar (2005-2008)
Mika Kajanen - Bass Guitar (2008 - 2016)

References

External links
Official homepage
Facebook
Bandcamp

Musical groups established in 2005
Swedish gothic metal musical groups
Swedish heavy metal musical groups